Marcello Casanova (born 1901, date of death unknown) was an Italian rower. He competed in the men's coxed four event at the 1924 Summer Olympics.

References

External links
 

1901 births
Year of death missing
Italian male rowers
Olympic rowers of Italy
Rowers at the 1924 Summer Olympics
Sportspeople from Genoa